Laino is a comune (municipality) in the province of Como in the Italian region Lombardy, located about  north of Milan and about  north of Como.

Laino borders the following municipalities: Alta Valle Intelvi, Blessagno, Centro Valle Intelvi, Claino con Osteno, Colonno, Pigra, Ponna.

Painter Livio Retti was born in Laino (30 November 1692).

References

 November

Cities and towns in Lombardy